White Crane may refer to:

Fujian White Crane, a southern Chinese martial art
Siberian crane, a nearly all-white bird in the family Gruidae
Tibetan White Crane, a western/southern Chinese martial art
White Crane Journal, a quarterly magazine of gay spirituality, published for 81 issues from 1988–2010

See also

 Crane (disambiguation)
 White (disambiguation)